are a group of parallel association football leagues in Japan that are organized on the regional basis. They form the fifth and sixth tier of the Japanese association football league system below the nationwide Japan Football League.

Overview

Japan is divided regionally in a variety of ways, some of them administrative and some more historical. For the football purposes, the country is divided into nine regions. 
All regional league champions earn the right to participate in the Regional Football League Competition (since 2016 renamed Japan Regional Football Champions League) at the end of the year. Runners-up may also qualify according to criteria set by the Japan Football Association.

Regional league clubs also compete in the All Japan Senior Football Championship, a cup competition. The winner of this cup also earns a berth in the Regional League promotion series, and the runner-up may also qualify depending on space and JFA criteria.

Regional league clubs must win the qualifying cup in their home prefecture in order to compete in the Emperor's Cup.

Since the divisions rarely go over 10 members, the season is shorter and long summer breaks may be taken.

Among the existing Japanese clubs there are ten that have never played in the regional leagues. They are: 
Japan Soccer League co-founders Urawa Red Diamonds, JEF United Chiba, Kashiwa Reysol, Cerezo Osaka, Sanfrecce Hiroshima (listed under current names, all formed the old league in 1965);
Independent club Shimizu S-Pulse, established as a professional club upon J. League creation in 1992;
Sagan Tosu who took over the folded Tosu Futures in former JFL in 1997;
Yokohama FC who were directly admitted into the Japan Football League in 1999 upon their formation;
Kataller Toyama that formed in 2008 as a result of the fusion of JFL clubs ALO's Hokuriku and YKK AP.
Kagoshima United FC that formed in 2014 as a result of the fusion of Kyushu League clubs Volca Kagoshima and FC Kagoshima, top two in the 2013 Regional Promotion Series, and which joined the JFL as a merged club 

Additionally, the forerunners to Tosu Futures, Kashima Antlers, Avispa Fukuoka and Vissel Kobe were originally based in different regions (and won or were promoted from those regions) from where they, or their successors, are based today:
Kashima Antlers was originally based in Kansai but moved to Kantō in 1975 after reaching the JSL;
Tosu Futures was originally based in Tōkai but moved to Kyushu in 1994 after reaching the former JFL;
Avispa Fukuoka was originally based in Tōkai but moved to Kyushu in 1994 after reaching the former JFL;
Vissel Kobe was originally based in Chūgoku but moved to Kansai in 1995 after reaching the former JFL.

Regional Leagues clubs, 2023

Hokkaido Soccer League

Tohoku Member-of-Society Soccer League

Kantō Soccer League

Hokushinetsu Football League

Tōkai Adult Soccer League

Kansai Soccer League

Chūgoku Soccer League

Shikoku Soccer League

Kyushu Soccer League

See also
 Sport in Japan
 Football in Japan
 Women's football in Japan
 Japan Football Association (JFA)

References

External links
 Japanese Regional Leagues summary, soccerway.com
 Hokkaido Football Association
 Tohoku Football Association
 Kanto Soccer League
 Hokushinetsu Football League
  Tokai Member of Society League
 Kansai Soccer League 
 Chūgoku Soccer League
 Shikoku Soccer League
 Kyushu Soccer League
 Japan Football Federation for Members of Society

 
5